The 2008 Asian Men's Junior Handball Championship (11th tournament) took place in Amman from 25 July – 5 August. It acts as the Asian qualifying tournament for the 2009 Men's Junior World Handball Championship in Egypt.

Draw

Preliminary round

Group A

Group B

Group C

Group D

Placement 9th–12th

11th/12th

9th/10th

Main round

Group A

Group B

Placement 5th–8th

7th/8th

5th/6th

Final round

Semifinals

Bronze medal match

Gold medal match

Final standing

References
www.handball.jp
www.asianhandball.com

International handball competitions hosted by Jordan
Asian Mens Junior Handball Championship, 2008
Asia
Asian Handball Championships